Mike Campo is a Spanish former footballer who played as a defender and as a football manager.

Career 
Campo was born in Lerida, Spain, and played football with various teams in Spain, and France. He played in the National Soccer League in 1957 with the Toronto Tridents. He re-signed with the Tridents for the 1958 season but was traded to Toronto Italia later in the season. He returned to his former club Tridents in 1959 and re-signed for the 1960 season. In the middle of the season, he was traded to league rivals Montreal Cantalia. In late 1960 he played in the American Soccer League with the Philadelphia Ukrainian Nationals, where he assisted in winning the league championship.

In 1961, he played in the Eastern Canada Professional Soccer League as Montreal Cantalia was a charter club. After the departure of Montreal in 1962, he signed with league rivals Toronto Roma. In late 1962 he was traded to Toronto City, and he returned to play with Montreal Cantalia for the 1963 season. He signed with Montréal Italica in 1964 and re-signed for the 1965 season. He played his final season with Montreal Italica in 1966.

The following season he played in the Quebec Major Soccer League with Montreal Hungaria. In 1969, he returned to play in the National Soccer League with Montreal Inter-Italia. In 1971, he played in the North American Soccer League with Montreal Olympique and served as an assistant coach.

Managerial career 
Campo became a player-coach in 1970 with Montreal Superga in the Quebec Major Soccer League.

He served as the assistant coach under Renato Tofani for Montreal Olympique in 1971. After the resignation of Tofani in early May he became the head coach for Montreal on an interim basis. He was succeeded by Sebastiano Buzzin on June 15, 1971.

References  

Living people
Association football defenders
Spanish footballers
Spanish expatriate footballers
Spanish football managers
Toronto Italia players
Philadelphia Ukrainians players
Toronto Roma players
Toronto City players
Montreal Olympique players
Canadian National Soccer League players
American Soccer League (1933–1983) players
Eastern Canada Professional Soccer League players
North American Soccer League (1968–1984) players
North American Soccer League (1968–1984) coaches
Spanish expatriate sportspeople in Canada
Expatriate soccer players in Canada
Sportspeople from Lleida
Year of birth missing (living people)